Vanguard Visionaries is the title of a compilation recording by American fingerstyle guitarist and composer John Fahey, released in 2007.

History
Vanguard Records had a high-profile during the 1960s folk revival and released music by many folk artists such as Doc Watson, Odetta and many others. To celebrate their 60th anniversary, Vanguard had released a series of artist samplers called Vanguard Visionaries from the 1960s and early-'70s era. Each contained a small track listing and all the tracks are available on other compilation packages.

Fahey recorded two albums for Vanguard: The Yellow Princess and Requia.

Reception

Allmusic critic Thom Jurek favorably reviewed the album, writing  "[Fahey] is forever unpredictable, no matter how often one hears these songs. His playing is simply the element of imagination and surprise itself.

Track listing
All songs by John Fahey.
 "Lion" – 5:10
 "March! For Martin Luther King" – 3:43
 "Requiem for John Hurt" – 5:09
 "Dance of the Inhabitants of the Invisible City of Bladensburg" – 4:10
 "The Yellow Princess" – 4:51
 "Irish Setter" – 7:16
 "Requiem for Molly, Pt. 1" – 7:40
 "Requiem for Molly, Pt. 2" – 7:45
 "Requiem for Molly, Pt. 3" – 2:33
 "Requiem for Molly, Pt. 4" – 2:56

Personnel
John Fahey – guitar
Production notes:
John Fahey – producer
Samuel Charters – producer
Barrett Hansen – producer
Vince Hans – compilation producer
Georgette Cartwright – creative services director
Amy L. Von Holzhausen – package design

References

John Fahey (musician) compilation albums
2007 compilation albums
Vanguard Records compilation albums
Albums produced by John Fahey (musician)
albums produced by Samuel Charters